The Lost Chord is a 1911 Australian feature-length film directed by W. J. Lincoln based on the famous song The Lost Chord by Sir Arthur Sullivan.

It was one of several films Lincoln made with the Tait family, who had produced The Story of the Kelly Gang.

Screenings were often accompanied by a singer who would perform the song. The film has been regarded as one of the earlier example of film-sound synchronisation.

It is now considered a lost film.

References

External links
 
The Lost Chord at AustLit

Australian black-and-white films
Australian silent feature films
1911 films
Films based on songs
Lost Australian films
1911 lost films
Films directed by W. J. Lincoln